Henri Marius Roger Bourrelly (12 December 190520 July 1991), known by his stage name of Rellys, was a French actor.

Selected filmography
 Three Sailors (1934)
 Merlusse (1935)
 Tobias Is an Angel (1940)
 Frederica (1942)
 The Revenge of Roger (1946)
 The Three Cousins (1947)
 The Atomic Monsieur Placido (1950)
 Life Is a Game (1951)
 Croesus (1960)
 Cocagne (1961)
 The Trip to Biarritz (1963)
 That Tender Age (1964)
 Dis-moi qui tuer (1965)
 The Gardener of Argenteuil (1966)

References

External links 
 

1905 births
1991 deaths
French male film actors
Male actors from Marseille